The Mémorial des Martyrs de la Déportation is a memorial to the 200,000 people who were deported from Vichy France to the Nazi concentration camps during World War II. It is located in Paris, France, on the site of a former morgue, underground behind Notre Dame on Île de la Cité. It was designed by French modernist architect Georges-Henri Pingusson and was inaugurated by Charles de Gaulle in 1962.

Description and history
Mémorial des Martyrs de la Déportation, located in Paris, France, is a memorial to the more than 200,000 people who were deported from Vichy France to the Nazi concentration camps during World War II. Designed by French architect, writer, teacher, and town planner Georges-Henri Pingusson (1894–1978), the memorial was inaugurated by then-President Charles de Gaulle on April 12, 1962. In the year of its opening, a brochure produced by the French survivors' group "Reseau de souvenir" described the memorial as a crypt, "hollowed out of the sacred isle, the cradle of our nation, which incarnates the soul of France -- a place where its spirit dwells."

The memorial is shaped like a ship's prow; the crypt is accessible by two staircases and a lowered square protected by a metal portcullis. The crypt leads to a hexagonal rotunda that includes two chapels containing earth and bones from concentration camps. The walls display literary excerpts. Pingusson intended that its long and narrow subterranean space convey a feeling of claustrophobia. The memorial's entrance is narrow, marked by two concrete blocks. Inside is the tomb of an unknown deportee who was killed at the camp in Neustadt. Along both walls of the narrow, dimly lit chamber are 200,000 glass crystals with light shining through, meant to symbolize each of the deportees who died in the concentration camps; at the end of the tunnel is a single bright light. Ashes from the camps, contained within urns, are positioned at both lateral ends. Both ends of the chamber have small rooms that seem to depict prison cells. Opposite the entrance is a stark iron gate overlooking the Seine at the tip of the Île de la Cité.

The memorial is open daily from 10am to 5pm from October through March, and from 10am to 7pm from April through September. According to Time Out Paris, an annual Day of Remembrance ceremony is hosted at the memorial on the last Sunday of April.

Inscriptions

The memorial features excerpts of works by Louis Aragon, French poet and French Resistance member Robert Desnos, Paul Éluard, Antoine de Saint-Exupéry and Jean-Paul Sartre. Fragments of two poems by Desnos, himself a deportee, are inscribed on the walls. The first consists of the last stanza of a poem written pseudonymously by Desnos and published "underground" in Paris, on Bastille Day 1942, "The Heart that Hated War":

A circular plaque on the floor of the underground chamber is inscribed: "They descended into the mouth of the earth and they did not return." A "flame of eternal hope" burns and The Tomb of the Unknown Deportee bears the inscription: "Dedicated to the living memory of the 200,000 French deportees sleeping in the night and the fog, exterminated in the Nazi concentration camps." At the exit to the chamber is the injunction, engraved, found at all sites memorializing the victims of the Nazis: "Forgive but never forget."

Reception
Architectural Digest included the memorial in its list of the "Ten Most Significant Memorial Buildings" and said, "Rather than rising heroically, the memorial is meant to evoke the unspeakable, anonymous drama of deportation—its entrance a descending stairway." Fodor's called the memorial "stark" and "evocative". The Guardian published a description by one of its readers, who noted the memorial's obscurity and called it "small, stark and savagely detailed... which goes unnoticed by the thousands of tourists who take selfies of themselves in front of the adjoining cathedral every day. It is a place for tears and quiet contemplation; a refuge from the crowds and a reminder of one of the darkest episodes in recent history."

Criticism
According to Peter Carrier, author of Holocaust Monuments and National Memory Cultures in France and Germany Since 1989, the memorial lacks specific references to Jewish victims, and "its dedication to 'the two hundred thousands French martyrs who died in the deportation camps'.. identifying victims as French nationalists, distorts the historical record by suggesting that victims died willingly for a national cause rather than as victims of state persecution." He further commented that despite its title, "inscriptions on the interior walls of the memorial account not for the conditions of departure but for the destinations of deportees… [The memorial] therefore symbolically assimilates the specific Jewish memory of the Second World War into national memory."

See also
 Drancy internment camp
 Fondation pour la Mémoire de la Déportation
 List of Holocaust memorials and museums in France
 Military Administration in France (Nazi Germany)

References

Further reading

External links 

 Le Mémorial des martyrs de la déportation (1960–1962), Les dossiers du "Groupe de Réflexion et Production" (in French)
 Memorial des Martyrs de la Deportation (Paris) by Johan van Parys, EnVisionChurch (2007)
 Photos: Mémorial des Martyrs de la Déportation – Paris, "A Teacher's Guide to the Holocaust", Florida Center for Instructional Technology, College of Education, University of South Florida (2005)
 Resources for Tracing Victims and Survivors of the Holocaust from France by Bernard I. Kouchel, JewishGen
 The Memorial of the Deportation: Little-known Memorial Is On the Ile de la Cité by Ric Erickson, Metropole Paris (1998)
 Under the Shadows of the Eiffel Tower: Holocaust Souvenirs of Paris by Lauren Cannady, College of Charleston (2012), pages 14–16 (PDF)

1962 establishments in France
Buildings and structures in the 4th arrondissement of Paris
Monuments and memorials to the victims of Nazism
Île de la Cité
Monuments and memorials in Paris
World War II memorials in France